Husnuzhon (born 21 January 1997), is an Indonesian professional footballer who plays as a forward for Liga 2 club Putra Delta Sidoarjo.

Career
Husnuzhon started his career when he participated in the PSMS Medan junior selection in 2015. His slick performances made him immediately promoted to the senior team and played in 2016 Indonesia Soccer Championship B. Only appearing half a season for PSMS, he then joined PS TNI which competed in the U-21 ISC. Together with PS TNI, he managed to bring PS TNI out as the champion of ISC U-21. Before joined Persiraja Banda Aceh in 2018, he briefly joined PSBL Langsa and Persika Karawang.

Persiraja Banda Aceh
On 2 August 2018, Husnuzhon signed a contract with Persiraja Banda Aceh. He will made his debut at Persiraja in the second round of the 2018 Liga 2 season. Husnuzhon suffered several injuries which forced him to miss out . In the 2019 season, he had to undergo a three-month recovery period from a tendon injury while playing for Persiraja Banda Aceh in the 2019 Liga 2 season until this team was promote to Liga 1.

Personal life
Husnuzhon hails from Kuala Simpang, Aceh Tamiang and is the son of Masmurjianto and Husnul Fatni. He is also a second sergeant in the Army Military Police Corps (Indonesia), He is also an active member of the TNI who serves in Central Jakarta.

Honours

Club
PS TNI U-21
 Indonesia Soccer Championship U-21: 2016
Persiraja
 Liga 2 third place: 2019

References

External links
 Husnuzhon at Soccerway
 Husnuzhon at Liga Indonesia

Living people
1997 births
Indonesian footballers
Association football forwards
Persiraja Banda Aceh players
Sportspeople from Aceh